Desulfacinum is an acetate-oxidizing bacteria genus from the family of Syntrophobacteraceae.

References

Further reading 
 
 
 
 

Thermodesulfobacteriota
Bacteria genera